

501001–501100 

|-bgcolor=#f2f2f2
| colspan=4 align=center | 
|}

501101–501200 

|-id=132
| 501132 Runkel ||  || Runkel, a German town in the Lahn Valley. Name suggested by students from the Johann-Christian-Senckenberg School in Germany. || 
|}

501201–501300 

|-bgcolor=#f2f2f2
| colspan=4 align=center | 
|}

501301–501400 

|-bgcolor=#f2f2f2
| colspan=4 align=center | 
|}

501401–501500 

|-bgcolor=#f2f2f2
| colspan=4 align=center | 
|}

501501–501600 

|-bgcolor=#f2f2f2
| colspan=4 align=center | 
|}

501601–501700 

|-bgcolor=#f2f2f2
| colspan=4 align=center | 
|}

501701–501800 

|-bgcolor=#f2f2f2
| colspan=4 align=center | 
|}

501801–501900 

|-bgcolor=#f2f2f2
| colspan=4 align=center | 
|}

501901–502000 

|-bgcolor=#f2f2f2
| colspan=4 align=center | 
|}

References 

501001-502000